East Leake is a large village and civil parish in the Rushcliffe district of Nottinghamshire, England, although its closest town and postal address is Loughborough in Leicestershire.  It has a population of around 7,000, measured in the 2011 Census as 6,337. The original village was located on the Sheepwash Brook. Kingston Brook also runs through the village. Near the centre of the village is the historic St. Mary's Church, dating back to the 11th century, which Sheepwash Brook flows past, and an old ford, which provided access to the pinfold. The church has six bells.

The Treaty of Leake was signed in 1318 by King Edward II and his baronial opponents.

British Gypsum, a plasterboard manufacturer, has its headquarters in the village. The manufacturing of plasterboard began in this area in about 1880.

Name
The origin of Leake appears to be Laeke (Old Norse – brook or stream), and is consistent with East Leake's position in the heart of the Danelaw, which had various forms over time before becoming "Leake". One of the earliest mentions of East Leake is in the Domesday Book (1086) recorded as "Leche". The name comes from the Anglo-Saxon word meaning wet land, since the village lies on the Kingston Brook, a tributary of the River Soar.

Local amenities
Four schools
Brookside primary school
Lantern Lane primary school
Millside Spencer Academy primary school
East Leake Academy (secondary school)
Leisure centre with swimming pool
Three pubs (Nag's Head, Three Horseshoes, and The Round RobINN)
Co-op supermarket
Post office
A variety of other small shops, e.g., florist, green grocer, hardware
Police station
Fire station
Amateur theatre group (ELAPS)
Folk club (ELFS – East Leake FolkieS)
Cricket, football, rugby and bowls clubs
"Meadow Park", a local nature reserve
East Leake pre-school play group a registered charity which provides term time play group facilities
2nd East Leake Scouts
Rushcliffe Golf Club

Transport
East Leake lies close to the A60 and A6006 major roads and within five miles of the M1 motorway. Nottingham City Transport operate a frequent (15 minutes at peak times) bus service (No. 1) between Nottingham and Loughborough under the "South Notts" brand.
An East Leake railway station used to exist, on the Great Central Railway.  That line was controversially broken up in the Beeching Axe of the 1960s.  The stretch from the point where the Great Central crossed the Midland Main Line in Loughborough through East Leake to Ruddington was retained to allow freight trains to travel to British Gypsum's works and to the MoD ordnance depot at Ruddington, but later fell into disuse.  More recently this stretch has been re-opened as a heritage line running steam and heritage diesel locos between Ruddington, Rushcliffe Halt (which is located next to the Gypsum works at the northern end of East Leake) and the South Loughborough Junction.  In the long term, the Great Central Railway (Nottingham) hope to reinstate a passenger service from East Leake station, although the fact that the area alongside the station has been redeveloped for housing would preclude the provision of public car parking in the area of the station, and would require permission from the Secretary of State.

Churches
There are five churches in the village:
 St. Mary's Parish Church (Church of England within the Diocese of Southwell and Nottingham).
 Our Lady of the Angels Roman Catholic Church
 East Leake Methodist Church
 East Leake Baptist Church
 East Leake Evangelical Church (meets in the Village Hall)

Geography and ecology

In 2017 European bee-eaters nested at CEMEX quarry, attracting thousands of bird-watchers. The European bee-eater is a colourful bird usually found in southern Europe, and seldom nests in the United Kingdom.

Gallery

Neighbouring villages
 West Leake
 Costock
 Gotham
 Sutton Bonington
 Normanton on Soar
 Rempstone
 Stanford on Soar
 Zouch

References

Publications
 Sidney Pell Potter, A History of East Leake, published in 1903. Potter was the rector at the time.

External links

Meadow Park
A Potted History of East Leake
St Mary's Parish Church
East Leake community website
2nd East Leake Scout Group

 
Villages in Nottinghamshire
Civil parishes in Nottinghamshire
Rushcliffe